José Hugo Burel Guerra (March 23, 1951), is a Uruguay journalist and author.

Biography 
Burel has worked as a journalist at various national periodicals of Uruguay.  He has also written several novels and anthologies.  His most important works are Los más jóvenes cuentan (1976), Esperando a la pianista (1982), La alemana (1985) and Matías no baja (1986).

Works
  Los más jóvenes cuentan (anthologie) 1976
  Esperando a la pianista 1982
  La alemana 1985
  El vendedor de sueños 1986 
  Indicios de Eloísa 1989
  Tampoco la pena dura (Novel) 1991
  Solitario Blues 1993
  La perseverancia del viento 1994
  El ojo de vidrio y otras maravillas 1997
  El elogio de la nieve 1999
  El guerrero del crepúsculo 2002
  Tijeras de Plata 2003
  Los inmortales 2004
  El desfile salvaje 2007
  Diario de la arena 2010
  El club de los nostálgicos 2011
  El hombre con una sola sandalia 2012
  El caso Bonapelch 2014

References

External links 
 Hugo Burel - Diario de la arena 
 Hugo Burel - Santillana 
 Burel's personal website biography 

Catholic University of Uruguay alumni
Writers from Montevideo
Members of the Uruguayan Academy of Language
1951 births
Living people